Vail Hotel is located in Pueblo, Colorado. Named after Pueblo newspaperman John E Vail, the hotel constructed in 1910 was considered to be the most modern hotel west of Chicago at that time.

See also
Yule marble

References

Hotel buildings completed in 1910
Hotel buildings on the National Register of Historic Places in Colorado
Commercial buildings on the National Register of Historic Places in Colorado
National Register of Historic Places in Pueblo, Colorado